Te Maori (sometimes Te Māori in modern sources) was a watershed exhibition of Māori art in 1984 (later continued to 1985, 1986 and 1987). It is notable as the first occasion on which Māori art had been exhibited by Māori, and also the first occasion on which Māori art was shown internationally as art. In retrospect it is seen as a milestone in the Māori Renaissance.

History

The Te Māori exhibition was driven by Secretary for Maori Affairs, Kara Puketapu, under the auspices of the Queen Elizabeth II Arts Council with funding from Mobil. Prominent Māori leader Hirini Moko Mead was co-curator of the exhibition. The exhibition was ten years in the planning. The exhibition featured 174 customary carved Māori art items from the collections of 12 museums in New Zealand. The largest contributor was the Auckland War Memorial Museum, who loaned 51 pieces. 

The exhibition started at the Metropolitan Museum of Art (the Met) in New York on 10 September 1984 and was also presented at Saint Louis Art Museum (February–May 1985), the M. H. de Young Memorial Museum in San Francisco (July–September 1985), and the Field Museum in Chicago (March–June 1986). 

Part of the exhibition was carefully held practices and values guided by Māori tikanga. This included a dawn ceremony, traditional karakia, speeches in the Māori language, waiata and kapa haka. Mead described the effect at the prestigious institution of the Met, "It did much to make tikanga Māori more acceptable not only to the population at large of Aotearoa but, more importantly, among our own people."

Te Maori: Te Hokinga Mai, the New Zealand leg of the exhibition, toured Wellington, Christchurch, Dunedin, and finally ended in Auckland on 10 September 1987, three years to the day after opening at the Met.

Artworks

The gateway of Pukeroa Pa
Patetonga lintel
Te Kaha pātaka carvings

Legacy and reception

The exhibition was very well received, both at home and abroad. It was very popular in New Zealand with the intuitions that hosted the exhibiting experiencing 'unprecedent audience' numbers. The impact of the exhibition is described by the late museum ethnologist Robert Neich:The effect of Te Māori has been so pervasive that its influence cannot be avoided. (Robert Neich 1985)The process of dialogue shared decision making and connection alongside the artwork as it was exhibited with iwi Māori (tribal authorities) left a legacy for indigenous communities and museums bringing an institutional shift. Part of the consultation was that iwi had to give permission for the artworks to be included in the exhibition highlighting the difference between museum ownership and authority. This was seen as an outcome of political and cultural advocacy by Māori since the 1960s. The objects displayed were called taonga by the institutes acknowledging more meaning than the term 'artwork'.   The model it established—one that favors the participation of indigenous communities in the interpretation and display of their art—has evolved as an international standard of practice for museums with holdings of Māori and Pacific art. (Maia Nuku, Curator of Oceanic Art, Metropolitan Museum of Art (2021))The international response to the exhibition influenced New Zealand media to pay attention to Māori art. It also made concrete changes to museums in New Zealand imbedding a bicultural approach to 'consultation, planning, presentation' and audience engagement with taonga.  It also influenced the new building of the national museum of New Zealand Te Papa.

The exhibition was criticised for what it excluded, which was toi raranga (fibre art / weaving) mostly created by women and contemporary Māori art. This was addressed in a new touring exhibition Te Waka Toi: contemporary Māori art from New Zealand which went around the United States over 1992 and 1993.

References

Further reading

External links
Te Māori at Ministry of Foreign Affairs and Trade
Te Māori and its impact at Te Ara

Indigenous art
Māori art
1984 in New Zealand
Art exhibitions in the United States
Metropolitan Museum of Art exhibitions
Art exhibitions in New Zealand
1984 in New York City
1985 in Missouri
1980s in St. Louis
1985 in San Francisco
1980s in Chicago
1986 in Illinois
1980s in Manhattan